This is a list of notable events in the history of LGBT rights taking place in the year 2023.

Events

February 
1 - 
A law legalizing same-sex marriage came into force in Slovenia.
Finland's  parliament passed a law allowing trans people to change their legal gender without them needing to be infertile or to have been sterilized before.
6 - The Hong Kong Court of Final Appeal ruled that government policy forcing transgender individuals to undergo sex reassignment surgery before changing their gender on their ID cards is unconstitutional.
 9 - The Senate of Spain passed, with 144 votes in favor, 108 votes against, and 2 abstentions the so-called ley trans, a bill which allows all transgender people 16 or older to legally change their gender by simply signing a declaration, without the need for prior phsycological counseling with a therapist, and transgender people aged 12 to 16 to legally change their gender under certain conditions.
 16 - The ley trans passed the Spanish Parliament after the Congress of Deputies approved it in its second reading with 191 votes in favour, 60 against, and 91 abstentions.
17 - 
A law legalizing same-sex marriage came into force in Andorra.
The  United Kingdom government used section 35 of the Scotland Act 1998 to block the Gender Recognition Reform (Scotland) Bill from receiving royal assent, effectively vetoing it. Had the bill become law, it would have made it easier for trans Scottish citizens to change their legal gender.  
23 - A South Korean High Court recognised the legal status of same-sex couples while ruling on a case considering a same-sex partner's right to spousal coverage under the national health insurance service.
24 - Kenya's Supreme Court ruled that, even if homosexual intercourse is prohibited by the law, the Executive Director of the Kenya NGO Coordination Board's refusal to officially register the National Gay and Lesbian Human Rights Commission (NGLHRC) as a non-governmental organization (NGO) was unconstitutional since it violated the principles or freedom of expression and of assembly.

March 
2 - The ley trans came into force in Spain.
7 - A court ruling legalizing recognition of same-sex couples and same-sex marriage came into force in Curaçao.

References 

2023 in LGBT history
LGBT rights by year